Musa ibn Abī Saʿīd ʿUt̲h̲mān ibn Yag̲h̲murāsan (died 1318), known as Abu Hammu I, was the fourth Zayyanid Sultan of the Kingdom of Tlemcen. He was proclaimed on 21 S̲h̲awwāl 707/15 April 1308 after the death of his brother Abu-I Zayyan I, which took place in 1308, ruling until 1318, the year of his assassination at the hands of his son Abu Tashufin I, who ascended the throne.

Biography 
When Abū Ḥammū Musa came to the throne, the Kingdom of Tlemcen was in serious crisis, given that it had been a few years since the long and devastating Marinid Siege of Tlemcen. Abū Ḥammū continued his brother's policy, designed to restore Zayyanid's power, managing to pacify the kingdom. He regained his authority over Banu Tujin and Maghrawa tribes and reestablished control over the coastal cities of Bijaya and Constantine. The fortifications of the kingdom were strengthened and managed to prevent Marinids from expanding beyond the city of Oujda. whereas he was busy maintaining a strong army, he did not care much about the material and intellectual status of his subjects. He often mistreated his son Abu Tashufin, who assassinated him and succeed him on the throne on 22 Jumada I 718/22 July 1318.

References 

1318 deaths
13th-century Berber people
14th-century Berber people
Berber rulers
Year of birth missing
Zayyanid dynasty